Possession Sound is part of Puget Sound, located in the U.S. state of Washington between Whidbey Island and the shoreline of Snohomish County approximately between the cities of Everett and Mukilteo. Possession Sound connects the main Puget Sound basin to the south with Saratoga Passage and Port Susan to the north. The Snohomish River flows into Possession Sound at Port Gardner Bay. Gedney Island, also called Hat Island, is located in Possession Sound.

Possession Sound was named by George Vancouver. On June 3, 1792, Vancouver landed near the present site of Everett and celebrated the birthday of George III by holding a ceremony claiming possession of the land of "New Georgia" for Britain. Due to his circumnavigation of the world, Vancouver's dates are off by one. June 3 was, by his reckoning, June 4, the king's birthday. His possession ceremony also involved the naming of Possession Sound, Port Gardner, Port Susan, and the Gulf of Georgia.

In 1825 a large piece of the southern tip of Camano Island slid into Possession Sound—an event known as the Great Slide. A resultant tsunami from the slide drowned many Indian residents of nearby Hat Island.  After that, the Tulalip Indians used the site only for seasonal clamming.

The Washington State Route 525, Mukilteo-Clinton passenger ferry run crosses the narrowest section of Possession Sound.

References

External links

Estuaries of Washington (state)
Everett, Washington
Bodies of water of Island County, Washington
Landforms of Puget Sound
Bodies of water of Snohomish County, Washington